The Chotia Gypsy is an American single engine, high-wing, conventional landing gear-equipped ultralight aircraft that was designed by John Chotia in 1980.

The Gypsy design was also produced as a kit plane in the early 2000s by Endeavor Aircraft & Automation as the Explorer. Even though kits are no longer available the Vintage Ultralight and Lightplane Association still offers plans for the design.

Development
Designer John Chotia created the Gypsy in 1980 as a development of the Chotia Woodhopper. The Woodhopper was itself a development of the Chotia Weedhopper. The Gypsy was intended as an easier design for amateur builders to construct than the Woodhopper, with its all-wood construction. The wing is of aluminum tube construction, with foam ribs and a covering of doped aircraft fabric. The design has a standard empty weight of  easily allowing it to qualify for the US FAR 103 Ultralight Vehicles category, with its maximum  empty weight requirement. The engine is mounted on the overhead keel tube in tractor configuration.

Unlike the open-air pilot seat of the Woodhopper, the Gypsy design places the pilot in a cockpit bathtub pod with a windshield that provides wind protection. The main landing gear has no suspension and the tailwheel is attached to, and steered by, the rudder directly. The controls are conventional three-axis.

The Gypsy was put into production in 2000 as a kit aircraft by Endeavor Aircraft & Automation of Paw Paw, Michigan at a price of US$6,900 for a complete kit. Production was completed in the mid-2000s and the kit is no longer available.

Variants
Chotia Gypsy
1980 version, plans still available.
Endeavor Explorer
Kit version, production commenced in 2000, out of production.

Specifications (Explorer)

See also

References

Chotia Gypsy
1980s United States ultralight aircraft
Aircraft first flown in 1980
Single-engined tractor aircraft
High-wing aircraft